La Galería de las Mujeres de Costa Rica (The Women's Gallery of Costa Rica) was founded in March 2002 to recognize the contributions of women to the cultural, political and socio-economic development of Costa Rica. The nominations are overseen and the gallery maintained by the Instituto Nacional de la Mujer (INAMU) (National Institute of Women). Of particular focus is the goal of preserving and protecting the history of women who have broken gender stereotypes and advanced human rights principals.

References

External links 
 INAMU Galería

Women's halls of fame
2002 establishments in Costa Rica
Costa Rican women
History of women in Costa Rica